Kherlen is a sum (district) of Dornod Province in eastern Mongolia. Its administrative center is the aimag capital Choibalsan.

Districts of Dornod Province